Patrick Charles Weigel (born July 8, 1994) is an American professional baseball pitcher for the Kansas City Monarchs of the American Association of Professional Baseball. He has played in Major League Baseball (MLB) for the Atlanta Braves and Milwaukee Brewers.

Amateur career
Weigel attended St. Bonaventure High School in Ventura, California. He played college baseball at Pacific University for one year before transferring to Oxnard College. He was drafted by the Milwaukee Brewers in the 22nd round of the 2014 Major League Baseball Draft, but did not sign and transferred to the University of Houston.

Professional career

Atlanta Braves
After one year at Houston, the Atlanta Braves selected Weigel in the seventh round of the 2015 MLB draft. Weigel signed and made his professional debut with the Danville Braves. In 14 starts for Danville, he went 0–3 with a 4.53 ERA. He started 2016 with the Rome Braves and was promoted to the Mississippi Braves in August. He ended the 2016 season with an 11–6 record and a 2.47 ERA. In 25 games (24 starts) between the two clubs, he pitched to an 11–6 record with a 2.47 ERA. Weigel started the 2017 season with Mississippi and was promoted to the Gwinnett Braves in May. The next month, he underwent Tommy John surgery and missed the remainder of the season.

Weigel made four rehab starts in 2018. The Braves added him to their 40-man roster after the 2018 season. Weigel split the 2019 season between Mississippi and the Gwinnett Stripers, going a combined 6–2 with a 2.73 ERA and 55 strikeouts over 63.1 innings. The Braves promoted Weigel to the major leagues on three separate occasions in 2019, but he did not appear in a game for them that season. Weigel was again promoted to the major leagues on September 4, 2020, and made his major league debut against the Washington Nationals.

Milwaukee Brewers
On April 5, 2021, the Braves traded Weigel and Chad Sobotka to the Milwaukee Brewers for Orlando Arcia. On April 28, 2021, Weigel notched his first MLB strikeout, punching out Miami Marlins outfielder Magneuris Sierra. In the game, Weigel threw two scoreless innings with 4 strikeouts. On  July 30, Weigel was designated for assignment by the Brewers. On August 2, Weigel was outrighted to the Triple-A Nashville Sounds. He became a free agent following the season.

Seattle Mariners
On March 14, 2022, Weigel signed a minor league contract with the Seattle Mariners organization. He spent time with the team in spring training, and was reassigned to minor league camp in March. Weigel spent the year with the Triple-A Tacoma Rainiers, making 53 appearances for the team and posting a 3-5 record and 4.21 ERA with 63 strikeouts in 62.0 innings pitched. He elected free agency following the season on November 10.

Kansas City Monarchs
On March 9, 2023, Weigel signed with the Kansas City Monarchs of the American Association of Professional Baseball.

References

External links

Houston Cougars bio

1994 births
Living people
People from Thousand Oaks, California
Baseball players from California
Major League Baseball pitchers
Atlanta Braves players
Milwaukee Brewers players
Pacific Tigers baseball players
Oxnard Condors baseball players
Houston Cougars baseball players
Gulf Coast Braves players
Danville Braves players
Rome Braves players
Mississippi Braves players
Gwinnett Braves players
Gwinnett Stripers players
Nashville Sounds players
Cangrejeros de Santurce (baseball) players
Tacoma Rainiers players